Aharenves Loabivey is a Maldivian romantic drama web television series developed for Baiskoafu by Mohamed Aboobakuru. The series stars Mohamed Aboobakuru, Aishath Yasir, Ibrahim Sobah, Mariyam Haleem and Ali Farooq pivotal roles. The first episode of the series was released on Baiskoafu on 11 May 2019. It revolves around the love-conflict between four siblings from two families. It was renewed for a second season in November 2019 and the first episode of the second series was released on 29 April 2021.

Premise

Season 1
Shiyan (Ibrahim Sobah), a diffident introvert, is romantically attracted to a young woman, Nashaya (Aishath Yasir) whom he meets at a party. He tries to confess his love for her on several occasions but fails due to lack of self-confidence. Meanwhile, Nashaya is in a relationship with his elder brother, Sharim (Mohamed Aboobakuru) while Nashaya's younger sister, Neesham (Fathimath Shama) crushes on Shiyan.

Season 2
After the demise of Nashaya, Shiyan tries to move forward while ignoring his soon-to-be bride Neesham. Soon after, Shiyan initiates an affair with Zara while his friend, Dr. Madhee starts dating Zara's friend, Karee. Shiyan decides to leave Neesham for Zara unaware that the latter is already married to a wealthy business man.

Cast and characters

Main
 Mohamed Aboobakuru as Sharim
 Aishath Yasira as Nashaya
 Ibrahim Sobah as Shiyan
 Mariyam Haleem as Thahumeena
 Ali Farooq as Waheed
 Fathimath Shama as Neesham
 Hamid Ali as Seytu
 Mohamed Shafiu as Madhee
 Sujeetha Abdulla as Karee
 Aishath Thuhufa as Zara

Recurring
 Zuleykha Manike
 Mohamed Musthafa as Akram
 Ibrahim Manik
 Ibrahim Majudhee
 Aishath Dhooma
 Ibrahim Naseer
 Ali Farooq as Neesham's father
 Mohamed Rifshan as Wafir

Soundtrack

Release
The first episode among the five episodes was released on 11 May 2019, on the occasion of 1440 Ramadan. A new episode is scheduled to release on Saturday at 21:00 of every week. The first episode of the second series was released on 29 April 2021, on the occasion of 1442 Ramadan.

References

Serial drama television series
Maldivian web series